The Wilson Creek area is located in the Grandfather District of the Pisgah National Forest, in the northwestern section of Caldwell County, North Carolina. Wilson Creek has a water system that originates near Calloway Peak and stretches for 23 miles before joining with John's River. It was added to the Wild and Scenic River System on August 18, 2000.

History 
The Wilson Creek Wilderness area was once used by the Cherokee Native Americans as a summer hunting ground. The area was settled in 1750, and at this time logging began in the dense forest. Mortimer, once the largest community in the Wilson Creek area, was the site of the Ritter Lumber Company sawmill which was destroyed by a storm that produced over 20 inches of rain in 24 hours in July 1916. The week before, a soaking rain had already saturated the ground and heavy lumbering aggravated the speed of the water rushing through the gorge. After a year, efforts to rebuild brought back the sawmill and a textile mill with the community also served by a new railroad line. The mills provided enough jobs to sustain 800 residents. If still in existence, Mortimer would be the county seat of Caldwell County, North Carolina (now Lenoir, North Carolina). However, it flooded again on August 13, 1940, with Wilson Creek reaching over a 90-foot flood stage. This event ended all efforts to bring in industry and left the area virtually deserted. The concrete shells of the old facilities are visible in a park area. Only a few residents and homes remain upstream at Edgemont, with most of the downstream area maintained for public use by the US Forestry Service.

Recreation 
The Wilson Creek area is frequented by hikers and recreation enthusiasts and also contains places to fish, hike, and camp. Dispersed camping is allowed throughout the forest area, but sites must be set up at least 100 ft. from any water. The Wilson Creek Gorge area is available for day use but there is limited parking.

Allowed activities include:

Camping, swimming, fishing, hiking, canoeing, kayaking, geocaching, and mountain biking

References

External links 

Rivers of North Carolina
Protected areas established in 2000
Pisgah National Forest
Protected areas of Caldwell County, North Carolina
Rivers of Caldwell County, North Carolina
Wild and Scenic Rivers of the United States
Tributaries of the Catawba River